Olmedo may refer to:

Places
Olmedo, Sardinia, a town near Sassari
Olmedo, Valladolid, a town in the province of Valladolid, Spain
 The First Battle of Olmedo, which took place in the aforementioned town in 1445
 The Second Battle of Olmedo, which took place in the aforementioned town in 1467
Fuente-Olmedo, a village in the province of Valladolid, Spain
Llano de Olmedo, a village in the province of Valladolid, Spain
Olmedo Canton, Loja, a canton in the province of Loja, Ecuador
Olmedo Canton, Manabí, a canton in the province of Manabí, Ecuador

People
 Alberto Olmedo (1933–1988), Argentine comedian
 Alex Olmedo (1936–2020), Peruvian-American tennis player
 Alonso de Olmedo y Ormeño (1626–1682), Spanish actor and playwright
 Atcel Olmedo (2002–2005), Mexican-American child murder victim
 Carmen Olmedo (1909-1985), Peruvian actress, dancer, songwriter, vedette
 Dolores Olmedo (1908–2002), Mexican businesswoman, philanthropist, and musician
 Esteban L. Olmedo, Argentinian American psychologist
 Fernando Olmedo Reguera (1873–1936), Catholic priest, journalist and victim of the Spanish Civil War
 José Joaquín de Olmedo (1780–1847), President of Ecuador and poet
 José Manuel Rojas Olmedo (born 1987), Spanish footballer
 Laura Piña Olmedo (born 1959), Mexican politician
 Leonel Olmedo (born 1981), Mexican footballer
 Manuel Olmedo (born 1983), Spanish middle-distance runner
 María Del Mar Olmedo Justicia (born 1983), Spanish paralympic judoka
 María García Olmedo (born 1957), Mexican politician
 Nicolás Olmedo (born 1983), Argentine footballer
 Olmedo Sáenz (born 1970), Panamanian baseball player
 Onib Olmedo (1937–1996), Filipino painter
 Pablo Olmedo (born 1975), Mexican distance runner
 Quiterio Olmedo (fl. 1907–1930), Paraguayan footballer
 Raquel Olmedo (born 1937), Cuban actress and singer
 Ray Olmedo (born 1981), Venezuelan baseball player
 Roberto Ortega Olmedo (born 1991), Spanish tennis player
 Sebastián de Olmedo, Spanish contemporary chronicler of the Inquisition
 Segundo Olmedo (born 1948), Panamanian Olympic wrestler
 Silvia Olmedo (born 1976), Mexican sexologist and TV host

Other uses
 Centro Deportivo Olmedo, a football club from Ecuador